Mirian II or Mirvan (მირვანი) ( BC) was a king of Iberia (Kartli, eastern Georgia) from 30 to 20 BC. His reign marked the reinstatement of the Nimrodid Dynasty, a continuation of the P'arnabazids.

Mirian is known solely from the early medieval Georgian chronicles according to which he was the son of king P'arnajom murdered by his son-in-law, the Armenian Artaxiad prince Artaxias I of Iberia who usurped the crown of Iberia. Mirian was carried to Parthia, there to be brought up at the court. He returned with a Parthian army, killed Arshak's reigning grandson Bartom in battle and became king. He was succeeded by his son, Arshak II.

References

90s BC births
20 BC deaths
Pharnavazid kings of Iberia
1st-century BC rulers in Asia
People from the Parthian Empire